Lathi is a 1996 Bengali family drama film directed by Prabhat Roy. The Film stars Victor Banerjee as the protagonist. It also stars Soumitra Chatterjee, Prosenjit Chatterjee, Debashree Roy, Satabdi Roy, Haradhan Bandopadhyay, Abhishek Chatterjee, Pallavi Chatterjee, Rituparna Sengupta, Deepankar De, Tota Roy Chowdhury, Sabyasachi Chakrabarty and Kaushik Sen. The music of the film has been composed by Bappi Lahiri.

Plot 
Atindranath Banerjee during his old-age and after his retirement after the long-term service in a local school get recognition and farewell from the same.

While returning home he gets his son-in-law, Somnath (Prosenjit Chatterjee) and his daughter Lipi (Satabdi Roy) to him back home. But, while returning home he finds that some daily availers is beating and harassing an old women belonging to the lower section of the society and stating that she is a kidnapper. He protests and saves that old women.

By the harassment of his sons (Koushik Bannerjee, Bodhiswatta) and daughter in laws he decides to treat them using stick and help them to improve. But, his youngest son (Abhishek Chatterjee) marries Banani (Rituparna Sengupta) without letting his father know.

But his father, provides everything and them started living in a slum and started teaching there. But, there also a political leader started harassing him. Meanwhile, his granddaughter Sonali(June Malia) gets involved in a sexual relationship with Tota Roychowdhury and gets pregnant. But at last everything becomes okey by the request of Victor Banerjee and he finishes the political leader and gets back to the slum and starts teaching there again.

Lathi (stick) here in this movie is used and stated that it is used by old man to improve the quality of living.

Cast 

 Victor Banerjee as Atindramohan Banerjee
 Prosenjit Chatterjee as Somnath Mukherjee, Atindramohan's son-in-law
 Debashree Roy as Late Kalyani Banerjee (flashback)
 Satabdi Roy as Lipi Mukherjee, Atindramohan's daughter
 Rituparna Sengupta as Banani
 Joy Badlani
 Pallavi Chatterjee as Uma (deceased)
 Soumitra Chatterjee as Sadananda, Atindramohan's friend (deceased)
 Sabyasachi Chakraborty as Prashanta's father,an IPS officer
 Abhishek Chatterjee as Nabin Banerjee, Atindramohan's youngest son
 Tota Roy Chowdhury as Prashanta, Sonali's boyfriend
 Deepankar De as Bivash Dastidar
 Manoj Mitra as Shibshankar
 Mrinal Mukherjee as Sashikanta Bhattacharya, an MLA 
 Haradhan Bandopadhyay as Pranotosh
 Nirmal Kumar
 Dulal Lahiri as Narayan Sen (deceased)
 Arindam Sil as Swarup, Sadananda's son
 Bodhisattwa Majumdar as Jyotin Banerjee, Atindramohan's eldest son
 Kaushik Banerjee as Bipin Banerjee
 Koushik Sen
 Chandan Sen
 Gita Dey
 Debika Mitra as Jyotin's wife
 Sanghamitra Bandopadhyay as Bipin's wife
 June Malia as Sonali, Atindramohan's granddaughter
 Pushpita Mukerjee as Pinki, Atindramohan's granddaughter
 Rita Koiral as Swarup's wife
 Soham Chakraborty (Master Bittu) (Child Artist) as Young Jyotin Banerjee
 Saheb Bhattacharya

Awards

References

External links
 
 Lathi (1996 film) in Gomolo

1996 films
Films scored by Bappi Lahiri
Bengali-language Indian films
1997 film awards
Indian drama films
Films directed by Prabhat Roy
1990s Bengali-language films